The 2010 season was Bunyodkors 4th season in the Uzbek League in Uzbekistan. Bunyodkor competed in Uzbek League, Uzbekistani Cup and AFC Champions League tournaments.

Squad

Transfers

On 16 February 2010 in JAR Stadium Conference hall Bunyodkor club management officially presented new signings for the season 2010.

In

Out

Loans out

Released

Pre-season
During winter break Bunyodkor held a training camp in Dubai between 9 January and the 22nd. During their second training camp, 25 January - 10 February, the club played 3 friendly matches.

Friendlies

Competitions
Bunyodkor was present in all major competitions: Uzbek League, the AFC Champions League and the Uzbek Cup.

Uzbek League

Results

League table

Uzbek Cup

Final

AFC Champions League

Group stage

Knockout stage

Squad statistics

Appearances and goals

|-
|colspan="14"|Players away on loan:

|-
|colspan="14"|Players who left Bunyodkor during the season:

|}

Goal scorers

Disciplinary Record

References

Bunyodkor
Sport in Tashkent
FC Bunyodkor seasons